An asperity is an area on an active fault where there is increased friction, such that the fault may become locked, rather than continuously slipping as in aseismic creep. Earthquake rupture generally begins with the failure of an asperity, allowing the fault to move.

See also
 Asperity (materials science)
 Asperity (geotechnical engineering)
 Earthquake
 Fault friction
 Fault mechanics

References

External links

 IRIS page on fault asperities with simple cartoon video of an asperity on an active fault
 IRIS page on "Modeling Asperities on a Strike-Slip Fault with Spaghetti"

Seismology